The province of Khyber Pakhtunkhwa, the third-largest province of Pakistan by population and the smallest province by area, is divided into 36 districts and seven divisions.

Below, you will find a detailed overview of the history of Khyber Pakhtunkhwa's districts and divisions, a map showing each district, the divisions of Khyber Pakhtunkhwa and their districts, and a list showing each district's name, the division the district belongs to, the district's area, the location of the district's headquarters, the district's population and population density (in 2017), the average annual population growth rate of each district (between 1998 and 2017), and a map showing each district's location.

History

1901 to 2010 

Districts have formed an integral part of civil administration in the subcontinent since colonial times. When the North-West Frontier Province (the former name of Khyber Pakhtunkhwa) formed in November 1901, it was divided into five "settled districts": Bannu, Dera Ismail Khan, Hazara, Kohat, and Peshawar, and a "trans-border tract" of land which encompassed five "Political Agencies": Khyber, Kurram, Malakand, Tochi, and Wano. The four districts Bannu, Dera Ismail Khan, Kohat, and Peshawar were considered "Trans-Indus" districts. 

By the time of the 1941 census of British India, Tochi Agency had been renamed "North Waziristan Agency", Wana Agency had been renamed "South Waziristan Agency", and two tehsils of Peshawar District (Mardan and Swabi) were split off to form Mardan District, which became the fifth "Trans-Indus" district. The six districts of the North-West Frontier Province had also all been given their own "Frontier Regions", which were tribal areas that were under the control of the deputy commissioner of an adjacent district.

1947 to 1954 

Upon the independence of Pakistan, the six districts of the North-West Frontier Province retained their borders and status within the province, but the five tribal agencies and six frontier regions all split off from the province, creating the Federally Administered Tribal Areas. The Federally Administered Tribal Areas was an administrative unit of Pakistan governed from Islamabad which had an area larger than the province itself.

In 1951, parts of Malakand Agency were split off to create the Mohmand Agency in the Federally Administered Tribal Areas.

1954 to 1972 

In 1954, the One Unit policy that consolidated all of West Pakistan into one province began. From 1954 to 1970, the North-West Frontier Province ceased to exist. The death of the province brought the rise of the area's first divisions (divisions had already existed in Punjab and East Bengal, but none of the other provinces had any divisions until One Unit). The area that once covered the North-West Frontier Province and Federally Administered Tribal Areas was split among two divisions: Dera Ismail Khan Division and Peshawar Division. Dera Ismail Khan Division covered Bannu District, Dera Ismail Khan District, North Waziristan Agency, and South Waziristan Agency, and Peshawar Division covered Hazara District, Kohat District, Mardan District, Peshawar District, Kurram Agency, Khyber Agency, Malakand Agency, and Mohmand Agency. The frontier regions which had previously existed were absorbed into their respective districts at this time. 

The One Unit policy ended in 1970 and the provinces returned with their original forms (which also meant that the Federally Administered Tribal Areas and the North-West Frontier Province were separate once more, and that the Frontier Regions regained their status as administrative units). The divisions that had been created as a result of the policy stayed in the North-West Frontier Province, but were abolished entirely in the Federally Administered Tribal Areas. 

By the time of the 1972 Census of Pakistan, many changes had been made to the administrative map:

 Malakand Division had been created between 1961 and 1972 using the area that covered most of the now-defunct Malakand Agency, and was split up into the districts of Chitral, Dir, Malakand, and Swat;
 The districts of Hazara and Mardan had absorbed their frontier regions;
 The Bajaur Agency was created out of the areas of the now-defunct Malakand Agency that were not placed in Malakand Division.

This meant that at the North-West Frontier Province was divided into three divisions and ten districts, while the Federally Administered Tribal Areas were divided into six Political Agencies and four Frontier Regions. The administrative divisions of the region were as follows (districts and divisions which do not exist anymore are in italic):

1972 to 1981 

Throughout the years between 1972 and 1981, new divisions and districts kept on being divided and created and changes kept on being made to the administrative map:

Hazara Division was created out of the area that covered the now-defunct Hazara District and parts of Swat District, in Malakand Division. Hazara Division was split up into three districts, which were Abbottabad District (formed out of Abbottabad, Amb, and Haripur Tehsils of Hazara District), Kohistan District (formed out of six tehsils of Swat District and eight union councils of Batagram Tehsil (in Hazara District), and Mansehra District (formed out of Batagram Tehsil (exc. eight union councils which were given to Kohistan District) and Mansehra Tehsil in Hazara District).

The agency of Orakzai was created out of parts of the Frontier Region Kohat (which still existed, but was smaller) in the Federally Administered Tribal Areas.

This meant that by the time of the 1981 Census of Pakistan, the North-West Frontier Province had 12 districts (two more than in 1972) organized into four divisions (one more than in 1972) and the Federally Administered Tribal Areas had seven Political Agencies (one more than in 1972) and four Frontier Regions. You can find a list of them below (districts and divisions which do not exist anymore are in italic):

1981 to 1998 

Between the 1981 and 1998 censuses of Pakistan, many changes to the administrative map of the North-West Frontier Province:

Dir District was split up into Lower Dir District (formed out of the sub-divisions of Dir and Wari) and Upper Dir District (formed out of the sub-divisions of Timergara and Jandool); the sub-divisions of Daggar/Buner and Alpuri were split off of Swat District to form the districts of Buner and Shangla respectively;

Batagram Tehsil was separated from Mansehra District to form the new Batagram District and many union councils which were once part of Abbottabad District (most of which were part of Amb Tehsil before 1981) were absorbed into Mansehra District; what was left of Abbottabad District was divided into Haripur District (formed of Haripur Tehsil and portions of Abbottabad Tehsil) and Abbottabad District (formed of Abbottabad Tehsil excluding the portions taken by Haripur District);

Mardan Division was formed out of Mardan District (formerly in Peshawar Division) and was split into the districts of Mardan (covering the area of Mardan Tehsil, part of Mardan District) and Swabi (covering the area of Swabi Tehsil, part of Mardan District);

Kohat Division was formed out of Kohat District (formerly in Peshawar Division) and was split into the districts of Karak (covering the areas of Karak Tehsil and parts of Hangu and Kohat Tehsils, all of which were formerly part of Kohat District), Kohat (covering the areas of Kohat Tehsil, minus the parts of the tehsil that were absorbed into Karak District), and Hangu (covering the areas of Hangu Tehsil minus the parts of the tehsil that were absorbed into Karak District);

Peshawar District was split into three districts, Charsadda (upgraded from Charsadda Tehsil), Nowshera (made from most of the area of Nowshera Tehsil), and Peshawar (made from Peshawar Tehsil and parts of the area of Nowshera Tehsil);

Bannu Division was formed out of Bannu District (formerly in Dera Ismail Khan Division), and was split into the districts of Bannu (covering most of the areas of Bannu Tehsil) and Lakki Marwat (covering the area of Lakki Marwat Tehsil, along with parts of Bannu Tehsil);

Dera Ismail Khan District was bifurcated into Dera Ismail Khan District (created from Dera Ismail Khan Tehsil) and Tank District (created from Tank Tehsil).

As for the Federally Administered Tribal Areas, the agencies remained the same and retained the exact same borders they had in 1981, but two more frontier regions were created: Frontier Region Lakki Marwat and Frontier Region Tank. These two frontier regions were created from parts of Frontier Region Dera Ismail Khan, which was, in 1981, split up into two non-contiguous sections. The northern section was divided into Frontier Region Lakki Marwat and Frontier Region Tank upon the creation of Lakki Marwat and Tank Districts, but Frontier Region Dera Ismail Khan retained the southern section.

This meant that by the time of the 1998 Census of Pakistan, the North-West Frontier Province had 24 districts (twelve more than in 1981) organized into seven divisions (three more than in 1981) and the Federally Administered Tribal Areas had seven Political Agencies and six Frontier Regions (two more than in 1981). You can find a list of them below (districts and divisions which do not exist anymore are in italic):

1998 to 2017 

In August 2000, all of the divisions throughout Pakistan were abolished, but were reinstated in their exact previous forms eight years later after the elections of 2008.

On the other hand, no changes occurred to the 1998 district setup for over a decade, until 2010, when the North-West Frontier Province was renamed Khyber Pakhtunkhwa. One year later, in 2011, Kala Dhaka Tehsil was separated from Mansehra District to become Torghar District, the 25th district of Khyber Pakhtunkhwa. These 25 districts (the 24 districts dating to 1998 and Torghar) were the only districts recorded as a part of Khyber Pakhtunkhwa during the 2017 Census. 

This meant that by the time of the 2017 Census of Pakistan, Khyber Pakhtunkhwa had 25 districts (one more than in 1998) organized into seven divisions and the Federally Administered Tribal Areas had seven Political Agencies and six Frontier Regions. You can find a list of them below (districts and divisions which do not exist anymore are in italic):

2017 to present 

In 2014, Kohistan District was bifurcated into Upper Kohistan District and Lower Kohistan District, but tensions on the bifurcation did not resolve until late 2017 (after the 2017 census), when Kolai-Palas District was formed as well. This meant that Kohistan District was still legally one administrative unit until after the time of the 2017 census (the bifurcation was delayed in light of the political tensions, and did not go through until late 2017, when Kohistan district was split into three districts).                  

On 31 May 2018, the Twenty-fifth Amendment to the Constitution of Pakistan was put into force. This amendment merged the Federally Administered Tribal Areas with the province of Khyber Pakhtunkhwa and changes the province's borders and layout drastically. Each of the seven agencies in the Federally Administered Tribal Areas (Bajaur, Kurram, Khyber, Mohmand, North Waziristan, Orakzai, and South Waziristan) was made into its own district and added into an adjacent division (Bajaur District became a part of Malakand Division, Khyber and Mohmand Districts joined Peshawar Division, Kurram and Orakzai Districts joined Kohat Division, North Waziristan District joined Bannu Division, and South Waziristan District joined Dera Ismail Khan Division). The six Frontier Regions joined the districts they were adjacent to (Frontier Region Bannu was incorporated into Bannu District, Frontier Region Kohat was incorporated into Kohat District etc.). 

In late 2018, Chitral District, formerly the largest district in the province by area, was bifurcated into Upper Chitral District, from Mastuj Tehsil, and Lower Chitral District, from Chitral Tehsil.  In 2022, South Waziristan district was bifurcated into Upper South Waziristan headquarter Spinkai Karzai  and Lower South Waziristan headquarter Wana.This raised the number of districts in the province to 36, where it stands to this day. You can observe the current setup in the maps and lists below.

List of Districts 

Below you will find a list of all 37 districts in the province of Khyber Pakhtunkhwa, along with the division it belongs to, the area of the district, the population and population density of the district, the average annual population growth rate of each district (between 1998 and 2017), and a map showing its location. The districts are initially listed in alphabetical order, but they can be sorted in different ways by clicking the headers of the table.

See also 

 Districts of Pakistan
 Districts of Punjab, Pakistan
 Districts of Sindh
 Districts of Balochistan, Pakistan
 Districts of Azad Kashmir
 Districts of Gilgit-Baltistan
 Divisions of Pakistan
 List of tehsils of Khyber Pakhtunkhwa

Notes 
A.  In 2017 Bajaur District was not a district of Khyber Pakhtunkhwa, but was an agency in FATA.

B.  In 2017 Bannu District was split into both the "Frontier Region Bannu" (a part of FATA) and "Bannu District".

C.  In 2017 Dera Ismail Khan District was split into both the "Frontier Region Dera Ismail Khan" (a part of FATA) and "Dera Ismail Khan District".

D.  In 2017 Khyber District was not a district of Khyber Pakhtunkhwa, but was an agency in FATA.

E.  In 2017 Kohat District was split into both the "Frontier Region Kohat" (a part of FATA) and "Kohat District".

F.  In 2017 Kolai-Palas District was not a district, but a part of the erstwhile Kohistan District. Today it occupies the area the Palas Tehsil used to occupy. Also, due to discrepancies in the source regarding the population of each of Kohistan's Tehsils (when the Tehsils are added one person is missing), a different and more up to date source is used for the districts covering the Kohistan region. 

G.  In 2017 Kurram District was not a district of Khyber Pakhtunkhwa, but was an agency in FATA.

H.  In 2017 Lakki Marwat District was split into both the "Frontier Region Lakki Marwat" (a part of FATA) and "Lakki Marwat District".

I.  In 2017 Lower Chitral District was not a district, but a part of the erstwhile Chitral District. Today it occupies the area the Chitral Tehsil (or Chitral Subdivision) used to occupy.

J.  In 2017 Lower Kohistan District was not a district, but a part of the erstwhile Kohistan District. Today it occupies the area the Pattan Tehsil used to occupy. Also, due to discrepancies in the source regarding the population of each of Kohistan's Tehsils (when the Tehsils are added one person is missing), a different and more up to date source is used for the districts covering the Kohistan region.

K.  In 2017 Mohmand District was not a district of Khyber Pakhtunkhwa, but was an agency in FATA.

L.  In 2017 North Waziristan District was not a district of Khyber Pakhtunkhwa, but was an agency in FATA.

M.  In 2017 Orakzai District was not a district of Khyber Pakhtunkhwa, but was an agency in FATA.

N.  In 2017 Peshawar District was split into both the "Frontier Region Peshawar" (a part of FATA) and "Peshawar District".

O.  In 2017 South Waziristan District was not a district of Khyber Pakhtunkhwa, but was an agency in FATA.

P.  In 2017 Tank District was split into both the "Frontier Region Tank" (a part of FATA) and "Tank District".

Q.  In 2017 Upper Chitral District was not a district, but a part of the erstwhile Chitral District. Today it occupies the area the Mastuj Tehsil (or Mastuj Subdivision) used to occupy.

R.  In 2017 Upper Kohistan District was not a district, but a part of the erstwhile Kohistan District. Today it occupies the area the Dassu and Kandia Tehsils used to occupy (between 1998 Kandia Tehsil split off from Dassu Tehsil). Also, due to discrepancies in the source regarding the population of each of Kohistan's Tehsils (when the Tehsils are added one person is missing), a different and more up to date source is used for the districts covering the Kohistan region.

S.  No area data is given for Kolai-Palas District and Lower Kohistan District because in the source (dated 1998), Palas Tehsil (which became Kolai-Palas) and Pattan Tehsil (which became Lower Kohistan), even though their populations were reported separately, the area that was given was the combined area of both tehsils.

References 

 
Khyber Pakhtunkhwa